Vyse may refer to:
 Richard William Howard Vyse (1784–1853), British soldier, anthropologist and Egyptologist
 Richard Vyse (1746–1825), British military General, father of Richard William Howard Vyse
 William Vyse (1710–1770), Archdeacon of Salop, father of General Richard Vyse
 William Vyse (1742–1816), Archdeacon of Coventry, brother of General Richard Vyse
 Vyse, main character in the console role-playing game Skies of Arcadia